Philo Vance's Gamble is a 1947 American mystery film directed by Basil Wrangell and starring Alan Curtis, Vivian Austin and Tala Birell. It was the first of three films featuring the detective Philo Vance made by the Producers Releasing Corporation, as part of a loose series of Vance films stretching back to 1929.

Plot

Cast
 Alan Curtis as Philo Vance 
 Vivian Austin as Laurian March 
 Frank Jenks as Ernie Clark 
 Tala Birell as Mrs. Tina Cromwell 
 Gavin Gordon as Oliver Tennant 
 Cliff Clark as Inspector Walsh 
 James Burke as Lt. Burke 
 Toni Todd as Geegee Desmond 
 Francis Pierlot as Roberts the Butler 
 Joseph Crehan as Dist. Atty. Ellis Mason 
 Garnett Marks as Charles O'Mara 
 Grady Sutton as Mr. Willetts 
 Charles Mitchell as Guy Harkness 
 Joanne Frank as Norma Harkness 
 Dan Seymour as Jeffrey Connor 
 Karolyn Grimes as Pat Roberts

References

Bibliography
 Backer, Ron. Mystery Movie Series of 1930s Hollywood. McFarland, 2012.

External links
 

1947 films
1947 mystery films
American mystery films
Producers Releasing Corporation films
American black-and-white films
1940s English-language films
1940s American films
Philo Vance films